Victor Gischler is an American author of humorous crime fiction.

Career
Gischler's debut novel Gun Monkeys was nominated for the Edgar Award, and his novel Shotgun Opera was an Anthony Award finalist. His work has been translated into Italian, French, Spanish and Japanese. He earned a Ph.D. in English at the University of Southern Mississippi. His fifth novel Go-Go Girls of the Apocalypse was published in 2008 by the Touchstone/Fireside imprint of Simon & Schuster.

He has also written American comic books like The Punisher: Frank Castle, Wolverine and Deadpool (including Deadpool: Merc With a Mouth and Deadpool Corps) for Marvel Comics. Gischler worked on X-Men "Curse of the Mutants" starting in the Death of Dracula one-shot and continued in X-Men #1.

Gun Monkeys has been optioned for a film adaptation, with Lee Goldberg writing the script and Ryuhei Kitamura penciled in to direct.

Bibliography

Novels
Suicide Squeeze (368 pages, paperback, Uglytown Productions, December 2001, hardback, Delacorte Press, March 2005, paperback, Dell Books, January 2006)
Gun Monkeys (304 pages, Dell Books, November 2003)
The Pistol Poets (368 pages, paperback, Dell Books, January 2005)
Shotgun Opera (320 pages, paperback, Dell Books, April 2006)
Go-Go Girls of the Apocalypse (336 pages, paperback, Touchstone Books, July 2008)
Vampire A Go Go (337 pages, paperback,  Touchstone Books, September 2009)
The Deputy (256 pages, Tyrus Books, April 2010, hardback, paperback)
Stay (Thomas Dunne Books, June 2015)
Gestapo Mars (a Carter Sloan novel) (297 pages, Titan Books, September 2015)
No Good Deed (288 pages, hardback, Forge Books, September 2018)

A Fire Beneath the Skin 

 Ink Mage (400 pages, paperback, 47North, October 2013)
 The Tattooed Duchess (368 pages, paperback, 47North, July 2015)
 A Painted Goddess (400 pages, paperback, 47North, March 2016)

Comics
Punisher MAX Special: Little Black Book (with Jefte Palo, one-shot, MAX, August 2008)
Wolverine: Revolver (with Das Pastoras, one-shot, Marvel Comics, August 2009)
The Punisher: Frank Castle MAX  #71-74 (with Goran Parlov, MAX, August–November 2009)
Deadpool: Merc With a Mouth #1-13 (with Bong Dazo, Marvel Comics, September 2009 - September 2010)
 "Great Balls of Thunder on the Deep Blue Sea" (with Sanford Greene, in Deadpool #900, December 2009)
Prelude to Deadpool Corps (with an issue each by Rob Liefeld, Whilce Portacio, Philip Bond, Paco Medina and Kyle Baker, 5-issue limited series, Marvel Comics, May 2010)
Deadpool Corps #1-12 (with Rob Liefeld, ongoing series, Marvel Comics, June 2010 - May 2011)
Death of Dracula (with Giuseppe Camuncoli, one-shot, Marvel Comics, August 2010)
X-Men #1-29 (with Paco Medina, ongoing series, Marvel Comics, September 2010 – June 2012)
Fear Itself: Hulk vs Dracula (with Ryan Stegman, 3-issue limited series, Marvel Comics, November 2011 - December 2011)
Buffy the Vampire Slayer: Spike (with Paul Lee, 5-issue limited series, Dark Horse Comics, August 2012 - December 2012)
Conan: The Phantoms of the Black Coast (with Attila Futaki, 5-issue limited series, Dark Horse Comics, October 2012 - February 2013)
The Shadow #7-12 (with Aaron Campbell, ongoing series, Dynamite Comics, October 2012 – April 2013)
Kiss Me Satan (with Juan Ferreyra, 5-issue limited series, Dark Horse Comics, September 2013 – present)
Clown Fatale (with Maurizio Rosenzweig, 4-issue limited series, Dark Horse Comics, November 2013 – present)
Noir (with  Andrea Mutti, 5-issue limited series, Dynamite Comics, November 2013 – present)
Sally of the Wasteland (with  Tazio Bettin, 5-issue limited series, Titan Comics, August 2014 – present)

Notes

References

External links
Official Blog

Interviews

21st-century American novelists
American comics writers
Place of birth missing (living people)
Year of birth missing (living people)
American crime fiction writers
American male novelists
Living people
21st-century American male writers